The swimming competition at the 1981 Summer Universiade took place in Bucharest, Romania.

Men's events

Legend:

Women's events

Legend:   

 Men's 100 m freestyle

 Men's 200 m freestyle

 Men's 400 m freestyle

 Men's 1500 m freestyle

 Men's 100 m backstroke

 Men's 200 m backstroke

 Men's 100 m breaststroke

 Men's 200 m breaststroke

 Men's 100 m butterfly

 Men's 200 m butterfly

 Men's 200 m individual medley

 Men's 400 m individual medley

 Men's 4×100 m freestyle relay

 Men's 4×200 m freestyle relay

 Men's 4×100 m medley relay

 Women's 100 m freestyle

 Women's 200 m freestyle

 Women's 400 m freestyle

 Women's 800 m freestyle

 Women's 100 m backstroke

 Women's 200 m backstroke

 Women's 100 m breaststroke

 Women's 200 m breaststroke

 Women's 100 m butterfly

 Women's 200 m butterfly

 Women's 200 m individual medley

 Women's 400 m individual medley

 Women's 4×100 m freestyle relay

 Women's 4×100 m medley relay

References
Medalist Summary (Men) on GBRATHLETICS.com
Medalist Summary (Women) on GBRATHLETICS.com

1981 Summer Universiade
1981 in swimming
Swimming at the Summer Universiade